Manganism or manganese poisoning is a toxic condition resulting from chronic exposure to manganese. It was first identified in 1837 by James Couper.

Signs and symptoms
Chronic exposure to excessive manganese levels can lead to a variety of psychiatric and motor disturbances, termed manganism. Generally, exposure to ambient manganese air concentrations in excess of 5 micrograms Mn/m3 can lead to Mn-induced symptoms.

In initial stages of manganism, neurological symptoms consist of reduced response speed, irritability, mood changes, and compulsive behaviors. Upon protracted exposure symptoms are more prominent and resemble those of idiopathic Parkinson's disease, as which it is often misdiagnosed, although there are particular differences in both the symptoms; for example, the nature of the tremors, response to drugs such as levodopa, and affected portion of the basal ganglia. Symptoms are also similar to Lou Gehrig's disease and multiple sclerosis.

Causes 

Manganism has become an active issue in workplace safety as it has been the subject of numerous product liability lawsuits against manufacturers of arc welding supplies. In these lawsuits, welders have accused the manufacturers of failing to provide adequate warning that their products could cause welding fumes to contain dangerously high manganese concentrations that could lead welders to develop manganism. Companies employing welders are also being sued, for what  colloquially is known as "welders' disease." However, studies fail to show any link between employment as a welder and manganism (or other neurological problems).

Manganism is also documented in reports of illicit methcathinone manufacturing. This is due to manganese being a byproduct of methcathinone synthesis if potassium permanganate is used as an oxidiser. Symptoms include apathy, bradykinesia, gait disorder with postural instability, and spastic-hypokinetic dysarthria. Another street drug sometimes contaminated with manganese is the so-called "Bazooka", prepared by free-base methods from cocaine using manganese carbonate.

Reports also mention such sources as contaminated drinking water, and fuel additive methylcyclopentadienyl manganese tricarbonyl (MMT), which on combustion becomes partially converted into manganese phosphates and sulfate that go airborne with the exhaust, and manganese ethylene-bis-dithiocarbamate (Maneb), a pesticide.

And in very rare cases it can be caused by a defect of the gene SLC30A10

Pathophysiology

Manganese may affect liver function, but the threshold of acute toxicity is very high. On the other hand, more than 95 percent of manganese is eliminated by biliary excretion. Any existing liver damage may slow this process, increasing its concentration in blood plasma. The exact neurotoxic mechanism of manganese is uncertain but there are clues pointing at the interaction of manganese with iron, zinc, aluminum, and copper. Based on a number of studies, disturbed iron metabolism could underlie the neurotoxic action of manganese.

It participates in Fenton reactions and could thus induce oxidative damage, a hypothesis corroborated by the evidence from studies of affected welders. A study of the exposed workers showed that they have significantly fewer children. This may indicate that long-term accumulation of manganese affects fertility. Pregnant animals repeatedly receiving high doses of manganese bore malformed offspring significantly more often compared to controls. It is found in large quantities in paint and steelmaking.

Diagnosis

Treatment 

The current mainstay of manganism treatment is levodopa and chelation with EDTA. Both have limited and at best transient efficacy. Replenishing the deficit of dopamine with levodopa has been shown to initially improve extrapyramidal symptoms, but the response to treatment goes down after 2 or 3 years, with worsening condition of the same patients noted even after 10 years since last exposure to manganese. Enhanced excretion of manganese prompted by chelation therapy brings its blood levels down but the symptoms remain largely unchanged, raising questions about efficacy of this form of treatment.

Increased ferroportin protein expression in human embryonic kidney (HEK293) cells is associated with decreased intracellular manganese concentration and attenuated cytotoxicity, characterized by the reversal of Mn-reduced glutamate uptake and diminished lactate dehydrogenase (LDH) leakage.

Epidemiology
The Red River Delta near Hanoi has high levels of manganese or arsenic in the water. Approximately 65 percent of the region’s wells contain high levels of arsenic, manganese, selenium, and barium.

References

Further reading 
 Lucchini et al., "Metals and Neurodegeneration" — Research paper on heavy metals poisoning
  — Critical review including manganese discussion from National Institute for Occupational Safety and Health (NIOSH)
 
 AWS Study on Welding and Exposure to Manganese — Report of an independent study commissioned by the American Welding Society
 Welding Fume Product Liability — Viewpoint of plaintiffs on welding rod litigation
 Welding Rod Litigation Information Network — Viewpoint of defense on welding rod litigation

External links 

Manganese
Neurological disorders
Toxic effects of metals